Flap (distributed in Britain as The Last Warrior) is a 1970 American Western film directed by Carol Reed and starring Anthony Quinn, Claude Akins and Shelley Winters.  Set in a modern Native American reservation, it is based on the novel Nobody Loves a Drunken Indian by Clair Huffaker.

Plot
Flapping Eagle lives on an Indian reservation in the southwestern United States. He drinks too much, one of many sources of disagreement between Flap and his sweetheart, Dorothy Bluebell. He also has on-going trouble with Sgt. Rafferty, a police officer in the city, who is brutal and seemingly bigoted (although criticized late in the story by Flap for being, as Flap puts it, only "half Indian").

Flap supports himself by making deliveries with an old pickup and help from his buddies. Spillage of a box of "Indian dolls" intended for sale as tourist souvenirs results in a ticket from Rafferty leading to the introduction of Flap's lawyer, Wounded Bear Mr. Smith. Rather than law books, Wounded Bear's office is filled with ridiculous stacks of parchments, eventually shown to represent the many treaty promises made to the tribe. Such treaties inform Wounded Bear's counsel to Flap in the incidents that follow.

Flap stumbles into activism, first disrupting a construction crew blasting and building a highway through Indian land (Interstate 25 was being completed through the location's pueblos at that time) and accidentally destroying the crew's brand new front loader, then stealing a train after Wounded Bear leads him to believe the train would become legal Indian property once it is "abandoned" in their territory.

Rafferty is violently beaten by Flap after a series of insults and abuses and the last straw, the shooting of a dog belonging to a poor, pitifully lonely, old Indian. Now a fugitive-cum-Indian activist whose protests have gained him publicity and popularity, again under counsel of a treaty that in this case suggests that unwarranted police action against him has reverted the city back to the tribe, Flap leads a march into the city to establish their claim. From a hospital window, Rafferty aims a handgun and assassinates him.

Cast
Anthony Quinn - Flapping Eagle
Claude Akins - Lobo
Tony Bill - Eleven Snowflake
Shelley Winters - Dorothy Bluebell
Victor Jory - Wounded Bear Mr. Smith
Don Collier - Mike Lyons
Victor French - Rafferty
Rodolfo Acosta - Storekeep
Susana Miranda - Ann Looking Deer
Anthony Caruso - Silver Dollar
William Mims - Steve Gray
Rudy Diaz - Larry Standing Elk
Pedro Regas - She'll-Be-Back-Pretty-Soon
John War Eagle - Luke Wolf
J. Edward McKinley - Harris
Robert Cleaves - Gus Kirk

Production
Intending to avoid cinema stereotypes of Native Americans , producer Jerry Adler hired Sir Carol Reed because the British director had not had exposure to the clichéd portrayal of American Indians in American Westerns.

Richard Harris (A Man Called Horse, 1970) was originally cast as Flapping Eagle, but withdrew from the production over creative differences, and was replaced by Anthony Quinn. Himself part Mexican-Indian, "Hollywood's favorite Indian warrior", Quinn had made several stereotypical Old West American Indian portrayals, including Crazy Horse in They Died with Their Boots On, a Cheyenne Indian in The Plainsman, and a fictional portrayal of Chief Yellow Hand in Buffalo Bill.

The role of Flapping Eagle was directed with American patriotic elements to communicate that the character did not hold total animosity towards the United States and was in fact a dutiful citizen; the character had been a decorated sergeant in the United States Army and wore a hat and shirt for the New York Yankees as well as a sea jacket (author Clair Huffaker was a US Navy veteran of WWII). The portrayal of Flapping Eagle as a heavy drinking veteran hero of WWII invited comparison to Ira Hayes. When wearing his full U.S. Army dress uniform in the final scenes, Flap also wore a coup feather, such as was awarded to some tribal members upon return from wartime service in the U.S. Military.

The movie was filmed in 1969 on locations in Albuquerque, Madrid, Puye Cliffs (Santa Clara Pueblo), Santa Fe, and Santo Domingo Pueblo.

After completion, concerned about reception, Warner Brothers kept the movie on the shelf for 18 months before general release. The November following production, 89 American Indians and their supporters occupied Alcatraz Island. Quinn was among the several celebrities who visited the Occupation. After this, the movie was promoted in connection and the Occupation, with posters proclaiming "The Indians have already claimed Alcatraz."

The movie was given a special premiere on Nov. 19, 1970 in the Cinema East Theater of Albuquerque with Anthony Quinn making a personal appearance. Admission was $100 per seat with all proceeds establishing a $75,000 creative arts scholarship fund for Native American students.

Reception
The film production drew protests, given the original title was Nobody Loves a Drunken Indian, particularly from local Indians when the production was on location in and near pueblo reservations.

Reception of the film varied; on one hand the film was praised for illuminating the plight of Indians in America, while Anthony Quinn's bumbling caricature (including a few of his signature dance steps from Zorba the Greek) drew criticism, inviting comparisons to his previous ethnic characters, e.g., a "Zorba the Navajo". "This picture made a joke of Indian rights. We don't mind a laugh at ourselves but this picture made us look like idiots."

Music
The song "If Nobody Loves" was written by Marvin Hamlisch with lyrics by Estelle Levitt. It is performed by Kenny Rogers & The First Edition.

See also
 List of American films of 1970

References

Bibliography
 Evans, Peter William. Carol Reed. Manchester University Press, 2005.

External links
 Characters at the switch in Kewa Pueblo, Placer Mountain in the background right.

Flap at Rotten Tomatoes
Flap at TV Guide (revised form of this 1987 write-up was originally published in The Motion Picture Guide)

1970 films
1970 Western (genre) films
American Western (genre) films
1970s English-language films
Films about Native Americans
Films based on American novels
Films directed by Carol Reed
Films scored by Marvin Hamlisch
Neo-Western films
Warner Bros. films
1970s American films